Wabigoon Lake is a lake located in the Kenora District in northwestern Ontario, Canada. The community of Dryden (pop 8,198) is located on the north shore of the lake, and the primary inflow and outflow is the Wabigoon River.

The name "Wabigoon" comes from the Ojibwe waabigon, "marigold", or waabi-miigwan, "white feather".

See also
List of lakes in Ontario

References

Lakes of Kenora District